Richard Jay Smeyne is a neuroscientist who is currently Professor and Chair of the Department of Neuroscience at Thomas Jefferson University, where he is also Director of the Jefferson Comprehensive Parkinson's Disease and Movement Disorder Center at the Vickie and Jack Farber Institute for Neuroscience. His research is focused on the cell biology of Parkinson's disease, as well as neuroprotection.

He received his doctorate in neuroanatomy from Thomas Jefferson University in 1989, and undertook postdoctoral training at the Roche Institute of Molecular Biology.

References

External links

 

Year of birth missing (living people)
Living people
Thomas Jefferson University alumni
Thomas Jefferson University faculty
Parkinson's disease researchers
Place of birth missing (living people)